Ibn Abi Talib al-Dimashqi (full Arabic name:), was a Syrian scholar and theologian of Islam.

Biography 
He was born near Damascus and remained in his hometown until his death. He worked on several subjects and served as an Imam at al-Rabwa. Ibn Abi Talib al-Dimashqi was given the titles Shaykh al-Rabwa and Shams al-Din. He likely had a son named Abd Allah, hence his  Abu Abd Allah.

References 

Sunni imams
Sunni Muslim scholars of Islam